Little Women is a lost 1918 American silent drama film directed by Harley Knoles and written by Anne Maxwell based upon the 1868-69 two-volume novel of the same name by Louisa May Alcott. The film stars Isabel Lamon, Dorothy Bernard, Lillian Hall, Florence Flinn, and Conrad Nagel. The film was released on November 10, 1918, by Paramount Pictures.

Plot

The plot is unknown.

Cast
Isabel Lamon as Meg March
Dorothy Bernard as Jo March
Lillian Hall as Beth March
Florence Flinn as Amy March 
Conrad Nagel as Laurie Laurence
Kate Lester as Marmee
Henry Hull as John Brooke
George Kelson as Mr. March
Julia Hurley as Aunt March
Lynn Hammond as Professor Friedrich Bhaer
Nellie Anderson as Hannah 
Frank DeVernon as Mr. Lawrence

See also
Little Women (1933 film)
Little Women (1949 film)
Little Women (1994 film)
Little Women (2019 film)

References

External links 

 

1918 films
1910s English-language films
Silent American drama films
1918 drama films
Paramount Pictures films
Films directed by Harley Knoles
American black-and-white films
Lost American films
American silent feature films
Little Women films
1918 lost films
Lost drama films
1910s American films